The Canaan Valley National Wildlife Refuge (CVNWR) in Tucker County, West Virginia, was the 500th National Wildlife Refuge (NWR) to be established in the United States. The refuge preserves a moist valley with unique wetlands and uplands at a relatively high elevation in the Allegheny Mountains. It is administered by the U.S. Fish and Wildlife Service (USFWS).

History

Advocacy for the establishment of a wildlife refuge in Canaan Valley began as early as 1961. In 1977, the Federal Power Commission issued a license to APS for construction of a pumped storage hydroelectric project, formally known as the Davis Power Project. However, the following year the Project was denied a Clean Water Act permit by the U.S. Army Corps of Engineers. The Corps' decision cited adverse impacts upon the Valley's wetlands, a relatively new concept at the time.

Canaan Valley NWR was initially approved following an Environmental Impact Statement on May 30, 1979. APS appealed the Corps' decision all the way to the Supreme Court, which in 1988 declined to hear the case, thus clearing the way for creation of the refuge. About  were purchased in the valley to establish the refuge on July 11, 1994. Another 12,000 acres (48 km2) were purchased from APS in 2002. This represents almost 70% of the valley's .

Wildlife
Several habitat types can be found in the wet soils of the forests, shrublands and open spaces in the refuge. White-tailed deer, raccoons, geese, and squirrels are common, and minks, bobcats, black bears, and barred owls can be seen. Beaver dams affect local water levels. Gamebird species include wild turkeys, ruffed grouse, and woodcocks. The area is also an important habitat for many declining North American bird species, including the bobolink, clay-colored sparrow, Henslow's sparrow, northern saw-whet owl, and cerulean warbler. The fish fauna includes native brook trout and introduced species of trout and bass.

Recreation and access
Facilitated refuge activities include wildlife observation and photography, hunting, fishing, hiking, environmental education, and nature programs.

The refuge maintains  of designated trails, including:
  for pedestrian use
  for bicycle use
  for horseback use

The refuge also maintains  of roads for licensed vehicles to provide public access.

See also
Canaan Valley Resort State Park

References

Citations

Other sources
Freshwater Institute and West Virginia Audubon Council (n.d. [but 1980s]), The Canaan Valley: A National Treasure, 12 minute educational film. (This film was produced to promote the refuge prior to its establishment and is still shown in modified form.)

External links
 Canaan Valley National Wildlife Refuge
 Canaan Valley at American Byways

Wetlands of West Virginia
National Wildlife Refuges in West Virginia
Protected areas of Tucker County, West Virginia
Protected areas established in 1994
Landforms of Tucker County, West Virginia
IUCN Category IV